Eric Chewning is an American businessman, veteran, former Chief of Staff to the Secretary of Defense, and current partner at McKinsey & Company.

Military service
As highlighted in Fred Kaplan’s book, The Insurgents: David Petraeus and the Plot to Change the American Way of War, Chewning left a career as a Wall Street investment banker to join in the U.S. Army in the wake of the terrorist attacks of 11 September 2001.  Upon completing Officer Candidate School and training as a military intelligence officer, he was assigned to the 1st Battalion, 5th Cavalry Regiment in the 2nd Brigade of the U.S. Army’s First Cavalry Division.  He deployed to Iraq in 2004 serving as the unit’s tactical intelligence officer.  During this deployment, Chewning helped to pioneer counterinsurgency tactics for conventional U.S. Army units.
Upon returning to the U.S., Chewning and Douglas Ollivant co-authored an influential article in Military Review, entitled "Producing Victory: Rethinking Conventional Forces in Counterinsurgency Operations",  and a 2007 follow-on article, entitled "Producing Victory: a 2007 postscript for implementation." The articles argued that U.S. forces needed to abandon sprawling forward operating bases and move into Iraqi communities.  The premise of their argument was that counterinsurgency requires military units to simultaneous execute security operations, train local security forces, promote economic development, and foster political institutions.  Ollivant and Chewning reasoned that conventional military units best operate in such an environment when partnered with indigenous security forces co-located among the target population.
The essays, which were based on Ollivant and Chewning’s experience during combat operations in Iraq in 2004 and 2005, significantly influenced the tactical deployment of US and Iraqi ground forces during the “Surge”.  A 2006 New York Times op-ed called it “a good blueprint” for turning around the military situation in Iraq. In March 2010, Ollivant and Chewning published an article in The American Interest outlining the military, political, and economic actions necessary for a successful US-Iraqi relationship after the initial US troop withdrawal.

Business experience
Chewning returned to the private sector in 2008, ultimately becoming a partner at the global management consulting firm McKinsey & Company.   While at McKinsey, he worked alongside financial sponsors and corporate leaders in the global aerospace, defense, government services, and space industries. His client work focused on corporate strategy, M&A advisory, and post-merger integrations. Chewning is a graduate of The University of Virginia Darden School of Business

Civilian appointee in the U.S. Department of Defense
Deputy Assistant Secretary for Industrial Policy
In October 2017, Secretary of Defense James Mattis appointed him to serve as the Deputy Assistant Secretary for Manufacturing and Industrial Base Policy (now Industrial Policy).  In this role, Chewning focused on issues at the intersection of technology, industrial enterprises, and national security.  He supported a more geoeconomic approach to DoD industrial policy, specifically in countering the macro forces working against the health of the U.S. defense industrial base. 
Chewning was the architect of the U.S. government-wide assessment of the manufacturing and defense industrial base called for in President Trump's Executive Order 13806.  The report identified five macro forces that needed to be addressed:
 Sequestration and DoD budget uncertainty 
 Decline of U.S. manufacturing capability and capacity 
 Harmful U.S. government business practices 
 Industrial policies of competitor nations – specifically China 
 Diminishing U.S. stem and trade skills. 

The unclassified version of the report identified over 300 specific industrial base risks ranging from access to rare earth magnets to single, sole source suppliers for key military equipment like cannon gun tubes.
He also testified before the U.S. Senate and House of Representatives to advocate to modernize the Committee on Foreign Investment in the United States and address the transfer of militarily relevant technologies to China. This culminated in the passage of the Foreign Investment Risk Modernization Act as part of the FY2018 National Defense Authorization Act.
In a November 2018 speech at the Atlantic Council on implementing defense industrial policy, Eric outlined five levers by which the Department of Defense implements its industrial policy. These include: acquisition policy, procurement decisions, DoD-direct investment, regulatory review of mergers through CFIUS and antitrust authorities, and exports controls.

Chief of Staff to the Secretary and Deputy Secretary of Defense
In January 2019, then acting Secretary of Defense Patrick Shanahan appointed Chewning as the chief of staff to the Secretary and Deputy Secretary of Defense.  With the announcement, one outside observer remarked “in my mind Eric is probably the smartest person over there.”
During the summer of 2019, Chewning played a critical stabilizing role in the Pentagon as an unprecedented three separate secretaries led DoD in a 30 day period.

Return to McKinsey
In January 2020, the Pentagon announced Chewning's planned departure from his role and a return to McKinsey, where Chewning had worked prior to working at the Pentagon.

Chief of Staff to the Secretary of Defense
In office: January 2019 – April 2020

Preceded by:  Kevin Sweeney

Succeeded by: Jen Stewart

Deputy Assistant Secretary of Defense (Industrial Policy)
In office: October 2017 – January 2019

Preceded by:  Jerry McGinn (acting)

Succeeded by:  Jennifer Santos

References

Year of birth missing (living people)
Living people
American businesspeople
McKinsey & Company people
United States Army officers
United States Department of Defense officials